Grandvillers is a commune in the Vosges department of the Grand Est region in Northeastern France. In 2017, it had a population of 753.

See also
Communes of the Vosges department

References

External links

Official site

Communes of Vosges (department)